Aurora Energy may refer to:
Aurora Energy (Alaska), an energy company in Fairbanks, Alaska
Aurora Energy (New Zealand), an energy company in Otago, New Zealand
Aurora Energy (Tasmania), an energy company in Tasmania, Australia